Freeman is an unincorporated community in Early County, in the U.S. state of Georgia.

History
The first permanent settlement at Freeman was made in the 1840s. A post office called Freeman was in operation from 1900 until 1902.

References

Unincorporated communities in Early County, Georgia
Unincorporated communities in Georgia (U.S. state)